"Queen of the Nile" is episode 143 of the American television anthology series The Twilight Zone. In this episode, a journalist becomes romantically involved with a dangerous, secretly immortal movie star.

Opening narration

Plot
Chicago columnist Jordan Herrick visits actress Pamela Morris, a 38-year-old woman known for her beauty and vitality, for an interview.  In Pamela's manor he notices a painting of her that is dated 1940.  Pamela still looks just as she did in the painting.  When questioned on this, she says the painter drew her when she was a child with a projection of what she would look like as an adult, and deflects questions about her age.  Pamela and Jordan flirt during the interview and make dinner plans for that night.  As Jordan is leaving, an old woman whom Pamela introduced as her mother, Mrs. Draper, warns him to never come back.  Mrs. Draper says Pamela is many centuries old and that she is actually Pamela's daughter.

During his date with Pamela, Jordan mentions that he is from Chicago, and Pamela volunteers she had played there once at a particular theater.  Jordan mentions what Mrs. Draper had said.  Pamela claims Mrs. Draper is mentally ill, but after the date, Herrick calls his editor and asks him to research Pamela's first film, The Queen of the Nile.  The editor reveals that the film was a remake of a silent movie filmed on location in Egypt.  Leading lady Constance Taylor was apparently killed in a cave-in near the end of the shooting.  The editor compares photos of Constance and Pamela in the same role and says they look alike.  The editor also reveals that the theater where Pamela claims to have played was torn down 40 years earlier.  Jordan asks the editor to dig up articles on every man Pamela has ever been involved with.

Jordan returns to the manor and confronts Pamela with his discovery.  Pamela drugs Jordan's coffee and then places a scarab beetle on his unconscious body.  The beetle drains his life until he has turned to dust. She then applies the scarab to her own chest.

The episode ends with another young and handsome columnist arriving to interview Pamela, starting the cycle once again.  In the closing narration, it is hinted that Miss Morris is actually Cleopatra VII, and that she has lived for more than 2,000 years.

Closing narration

Production notes
Apparently, in the original first-draft script, a handsome young policeman turns up at the end of the story, asking Pamela Morris as to the whereabouts of the now missing Jordan Herrick. She begins to flatter and flirt with the cop, setting him up to start the cycle all over again.

Footnotes
The footage of Herrick aging is an old movie trick: the same type as used in Long Live Walter Jameson.
The footage of the victim's body becoming dust is recycled footage from Long Live Walter Jameson.
The theme of a woman who seduces men to stay immortal is in the classic poem La Belle Dame sans Merci

References
DeVoe, Bill. (2008). Trivia from The Twilight Zone. Albany, GA: Bear Manor Media. 
Grams, Martin. (2008). The Twilight Zone: Unlocking the Door to a Television Classic. Churchville, MD: OTR Publishing.

External links

1964 American television episodes
The Twilight Zone (1959 TV series season 5) episodes
Depictions of Cleopatra on television
Television episodes about immortality
Television episodes written by Jerry Sohl